Sean Michael Gunn (born 23 December 1993) is a Zimbabwean swimmer. He competed in the men's 100 metre freestyle event at the 2016 Summer Olympics.

References

External links
 

1993 births
Living people
Sportspeople from Harare
Zimbabwean male freestyle swimmers
Olympic swimmers of Zimbabwe
Swimmers at the 2016 Summer Olympics
African Games bronze medalists for Zimbabwe
African Games medalists in swimming
Swimmers at the 2015 African Games
Kentucky Wildcats men's swimmers